Wiesława Kwaśniewska (born 16 June 1933) is a Polish actress. She appeared in more than twenty films and television shows between 1951 and 1984.

Selected filmography
 How to Be Loved (1963)
 Panienka z okienka (1964)

References

External links

1933 births
Living people
Polish film actresses
Actors from Łódź